Voter is a 2019 Indian Telugu-language political thriller film written and directed by G. S. Karthik Reddy and produced by Pudhota Sudheer Kumar. The film stars Vishnu Manchu and Surbhi in lead roles, with Sampath Raj, Posani Krishna Murali, Jayaprakash, Nassar in prominent roles. The music is composed by S. Thaman. It was released on 21 June 2019.

Plot 
 
Gautam, who works in the US, comes back to India to cast his vote. In this process, he falls in love with Bhavana and proposes to her. Bhavana lays a condition to Gautam that if he fulfills a particular task related to a dreaded central minister, Bhanu Shankar she will accept his love.

Cast 

 Vishnu Manchu as Gautam
 Surbhi as Bhavana
 Sampath Raj as Central Minister Bhanu Shankar
 Posani Krishna Murali as M.L.A. 
 Jayaprakash as Siva
 Nassar as Krishnamoorthy
 Brahmaji as Madhava Rao
 Supreet as Prakash
 Praveen as Jagdish
 Pragathi as Pragathi
 L.B. Sriram as Bhiksaraju
 Shanoor Sana as Bhavana's mother
 Sravan as Gautam's friend
 Vamsi as Gautam's friend
 Mou Rahman as Ross
 Charandeep as Bhanu Shankar's assistant
 Jeeva as Traffic Police Officer

Soundtrack 

The soundtrack of the film was composed by S. Thaman and lyrics by Ramajogaiah Sastry.

Release 
It was theatrically released on 21 June 2019. The film was also dubbed and released in Hindi on YouTube by Aditya Movies on 23 May 2021.

Reception 
The film received negative reviews from critics. Y Sunita Chowdhary of The Hindu opined that there was nothing new to hold attention. She noted that the entire story had been woven around the re-call concept, which is, "A new concept called ‘Re-call’ election, which means once a politician is voted to power and people are unhappy with him, they needn’t wait for a full five-year term; they can have a re-call poll and vote him out". She felt that there’s nothing to appreciate in music and cinematography also.

References

External links
 

2019 films
2010s Telugu-language films
Indian political thriller films
2010s political thriller films